Paremhat 19 - Coptic Calendar - Paremhat 21 

The twentieth day of the Coptic month of Paremhat, the seventh month of the Coptic year. In common years, this day corresponds to March 16, of the Julian Calendar, and March 29, of the Gregorian Calendar. This day falls in the Coptic Season of Shemu, the season of the Harvest.

Commemorations

Saints 

 The departure of Pope Michael III, the 56th Patriarch of the See of Saint Mark

Other commemorations 

 The commemoration of the Raising of Saint Lazarus from the Dead

References 

Days of the Coptic calendar